Methuen  may refer to:

Methuen (surname)
Methuen, Massachusetts, a U.S. city
Methuen High School
Methuen Mall
Baron Methuen, a British title of nobility
Methuen Cove, South Orkney Islands
Methuen Publishing, Methuen & Co. Ltd., a British publishing firm
Methuen Treaty, a 1703 treaty on wine and textiles trade between Portugal and England

See also
Methven (disambiguation)
Methuen Memorial Music Hall
Methuen Police Department
Methuen Water Works
Methuen's Dwarf Gecko